Siloam School is a historic Rosenwald School building located at Charlotte, Mecklenburg County, North Carolina. It was built about 1920 as a school for African-American students.  It is a one-story, gable-front, one-room school building. It measures approximately 22 feet by 43 feet. The building ceased to operate as a school about 1947.

It was added to the National Register of Historic Places in 2007.

References

One-room schoolhouses in North Carolina
Rosenwald schools in North Carolina
School buildings on the National Register of Historic Places in North Carolina
School buildings completed in 1920
Schools in Charlotte, North Carolina
National Register of Historic Places in Mecklenburg County, North Carolina
1920 establishments in North Carolina